The Newton Homesite and Cemetery are a remnant of the earliest settlement of the outer coast of North Carolina near Carolina Beach.  The site is located southwest of Carolina Beach off Dow Road South, adjacent to the Federal Point Methodist Cemetery.  It includes a small cemetery of its own, and the archaeological remains of an early homestead, dating to the early 18th century, and that of an early 19th-century homestead.

The site was listed on the National Register of Historic Places in 1997.

See also
 National Register of Historic Places listings in New Hanover County, North Carolina

References

External links

 

Cemeteries on the National Register of Historic Places in North Carolina
Archaeological sites on the National Register of Historic Places in North Carolina
New Hanover County, North Carolina
National Register of Historic Places in New Hanover County, North Carolina